HD 77912 is a single star in the northern constellation of Lynx. It is visible to the naked eye with an apparent visual magnitude of 4.56. It is moving further away with a heliocentric radial velocity of +16.6 km/s.

It has 4.6 times the mass of the Sun and has expanded to 33 times the Sun's radius. The star is radiating 1,168 times the Sun's luminosity from its enlarged photosphere at an effective temperature of 4,899 K.

References

G-type bright giants
Lynx (constellation)
Durchmusterung objects
077912
044700
3612